Chae-young is a Korean feminine given name. Its meaning differs based on the hanja used to write each syllable of the name. There are 17 hanja with the reading "chae" and 34 hanja with the reading "young" on the South Korean government's official list of hanja which may be registered for use in given names.

People with this name include:
 Yoo Chae-yeong (1977–2014), South Korean singer and actress
 Han Chae-young (born 1980), South Korean actress
 Lee Chae-young (born 1986), South Korean actress
 Kang Chae-young (born 1996), South Korean archer
 Rosé (Korean name Park Chae-young, born 1997), South Korean singer, member of K-pop group Blackpink
 Chaeyoung (full name Son Chae-young, born 1999), South Korean singer, member of K-pop group Twice

See also
List of Korean given names

References

Korean feminine given names